Just Dance: Summer Party (known as Just Dance 2: Extra Songs in Australia and Europe) is a limited edition dance rhythm game developed by Ubisoft Paris and published by Ubisoft. It features all of the DLC and Best Buy exclusive songs from Just Dance 2 (except for "It's Not Unusual", "Crazy Christmas", "Spice Up Your Life", "Come on Eileen", and "Should I Stay or Should I Go") on a single disc, with that said title used as its basis. It was released on July 17, 2011 in Australia and Europe and July 19, 2011 in North America.

Note: There are two errors. The PAL region cover has the coach for "It's Not Unusual" even though the song is not in the game, and the NTSC region cover has the coach for "Should I Stay or Should I Go" even though it is also not in the game.

Gameplay

Like Just Dance and Just Dance 2, up to four players can play to mirror on-screen dance choreography from over 20 songs, as they are judged on their ability to follow a dance routine to a chosen song. The different modes are all as the same as Just Dance 2, the "Classic", "Duets", "Simon Says", "Race", "Non-Stop Shuffle", and "Just Sweat". Along the game's track list are the DLC, and Best Buy exclusives from Just Dance 2, except "It's Not Unusual", "Crazy Christmas", "Spice Up Your Life", "Come on Eileen", and "Should I Stay or Should I Go". However all of them were planned to be in the game.

Track list
The game features 23 songs, all from the downloadable content and Best Buy exclusives of Just Dance 2, except the aforementioned songs.

External links
 List of songs

2011 video games
Just Dance (video game series)
Wii games
Wii-only games
Dance video games
Fitness games
Music video games
Ubisoft games
Video games developed in France